Henry George Templar (October 18, 1904 – August 5, 1988) was a United States district judge of the United States District Court for the District of Kansas.

Education and career

Born in Cowley County, Kansas, Templar received a Bachelor of Laws from Washburn University School of Law in 1927. He was in private practice in Arkansas City, Kansas from 1927 to 1953. He was a deputy oil inspector for the State of Kansas from 1930 to 1932. He was a member of the Kansas House of Representatives from 1933 to 1941. He was a member of the Kansas Senate from 1945 to 1953. He was the United States Attorney for the District of Kansas from 1953 to 1954. He was in private practice in Arkansas City from 1955 to 1962.

Federal judicial service

Templar was nominated by President John F. Kennedy on March 21, 1962, to the United States District Court for the District of Kansas, to a new seat created by 75 Stat. 80. He was confirmed by the United States Senate on April 11, 1962, and received his commission on April 12, 1962. He assumed senior status on November 1, 1974. Templar served in that capacity until his death on August 5, 1988.

References

Sources
 

1904 births
1988 deaths
People from Arkansas City, Kansas
Members of the Kansas House of Representatives
Kansas state senators
Judges of the United States District Court for the District of Kansas
United States district court judges appointed by John F. Kennedy
20th-century American judges
20th-century American lawyers
20th-century American politicians